Kassa Balcha (born 5 December 1955) is a retired Ethiopian long-distance runner.

At the 1985 World Cross Country Championships Balcha finished your in the long race. This was good enough to help Ethiopia win a gold medal in the team competition.

References

1955 births
Ethiopian male long-distance runners
Athletes (track and field) at the 1980 Summer Olympics
Olympic athletes of Ethiopia
Living people
Ethiopian male cross country runners